The city of Ottawa, Canada held municipal elections on December 1, 1969.

Controller Kenneth Fogarty is easily elected as mayor. This would be the last election where two aldermen would be elected from each ward.

Mayor of Ottawa

Ottawa Board of Control
(4 elected)

City council

(2 elected from each ward)

*Results official for winning candidates only, or those in close races.

References

Ottawa Journal, December 2, 1969

Municipal elections in Ottawa
1969 elections in Canada
1960s in Ottawa
1969 in Ontario
December 1969 events in North America